This is a list of bridges and tunnels on the National Register of Historic Places in the U.S. state of North Dakota.

References

 
North Dakota
Bridges
Bridges